Tino Cucca (born February 2, 1984) is a Canadian former soccer player.

Playing career 
Cucca began his career in 2004 with the Vancouver Whitecaps in the USL A-League, where he appeared in a total of 14 matches and recorded 1 goal. In 2007, he signed with the Columbus Clan F.C. in the Vancouver Metro Soccer League. In his debut season they won the British Columbia Provincial Soccer Championship, and also reached the finals of the Open Canada Cup. In 2009, he won the VMSL Golden Boot Award.

International career 
He made his debut for the Canada men's national under-17 soccer team on April 18, 2001 against El Salvador at the 2001 CONCACAF U-17 Tournament.

References 

1984 births
Living people
Canadian soccer players
Canadian people of Italian descent
Vancouver Whitecaps (1986–2010) players
A-League (1995–2004) players
USL First Division players
Soccer people from British Columbia
Association football midfielders
Association football forwards
Vancouver Columbus players